Ranunculus polyanthemos is a species of flowering plant belonging to the family Ranunculaceae.

Its native range is Europe to Russian Far East and Iran.

References

polyanthemos